Martin Luther King Jr. Boulevard may refer to:

Streets
 Martin Luther King Jr. Boulevard (Fayetteville, Arkansas)
 Martin Luther King Jr. Boulevard (Las Vegas), California
 Martin Luther King Jr. Boulevard (Los Angeles), California
 Martin Luther King Jr. Parkway (Jacksonville), Florida
 Martin Luther King Jr. Boulevard (Savannah), Georgia
 Martin Luther King Jr. Boulevard (New Orleans), Louisiana
 Martin Luther King Jr. Boulevard (Baltimore), Maryland
 Martin Luther King Jr. Boulevard (Atlantic City), New Jersey
 Martin Luther King, Jr., Boulevard (Manhattan), New York City
 Martin Luther King Jr. Boulevard (Portland), Oregon
 Martin Luther King Jr. Boulevard (Eugene), Oregon
 Martin Luther King Jr. Boulevard (Austin), Texas

Other uses
 Martin Luther King Boulevard/Mack Avenue station, QLINE, Detroit, Michigan

See also
 List of streets named after Martin Luther King Jr.
 Martin Luther King Jr. Drive (disambiguation)
 Martin Luther King Jr. Expressway (disambiguation)
 Martin Luther King Jr. Freeway (disambiguation)
 Martin Luther King Jr. Parkway (disambiguation)
 Martin Luther King Jr. Way (disambiguation)